Eternal Return is the fourth studio album by doom metal band Windhand. It was released on 5 October 2018 by Relapse Records. The album was produced by Jack Endino and is the band's first without founding guitarist Asechiah Bogdan.

Critical reception 

The album has received generally favorable reviews. Pitchfork noted the band's new sense of experimentation with grunge and psychedelic sounds and a compelling performance by singer Dorthia Cottrell, adding that "Cottrell’s often been great on Windhand’s quiet songs, but she’s never sounded like such a convincing rock bandleader." Metal Injection noted that the band has finally found its own style, saying "Windhand returns (eternally) to lift the fog, clear the mist, and define their own obscurities through a fantastic album that properly carves out their identity." The Obelisk also noticed the grunge influence, stating "Windhand aren’t simply donning a flannel and tucking their jeans into their Doc Martens — they’re taking the influence of grunge and working it into their own sonic context, just as they’ve always done with their influences," while Spectrum Culture also noted new strength in Cottrell's vocals.

Track listing

Personnel 
Dorthia Cottrell – vocals
Garrett Morris – guitar
Parker Chandler – bass
Ryan Wolfe – drums

Charts

References

2018 albums
Windhand albums
Relapse Records albums
Albums produced by Jack Endino